KIHI (88.9 FM) was a radio station licensed to Burns, Wyoming, United States. The station was owned by Cedar Cove Broadcasting, Inc.

Cedar Cove Broadcasting surrendered KIHI's license to the Federal Communications Commission (FCC) on January 7, 2016; the FCC cancelled the station's license and deleted the call sign from the database on January 12.

References

External links
 

Defunct religious radio stations in the United States
IHI
Radio stations established in 2008
2008 establishments in Wyoming
Defunct radio stations in the United States
Radio stations disestablished in 2016
2016 disestablishments in Wyoming
IHI